White Topee (1954) is a novel by Australian writer Eve Langley.

Plot summary
The novel is set in Gippsland, Victoria, which is depicted as an idyllic place with peoples from many nations working on the land in harmony. The novel is a sequel of sorts to the author's earlier book The Pea-Pickers, and features the same characters two years later.

Critical reception
Peter Harding, writing in The Sydney Morning Herald, found the novel "is, more than anything else, a poem. Plain prose and formal verse intersperse many of its 250 pages, but much of it is a poem disguised as prose. The poem is about Australia and Italians, and about a poet's ecstatic, anguished memories of youth in Gippsland and probably somewhere in northern Australia. And in reading it one is in the presence of something great amid a rambling eccentricity."

Peggy Wright was impressed with the novel in The News (Adelaide): "It is impossible to be lukewarm about Eve Langley. Either you lap up her strikingly original prose, or you wonder what the heck she's writing about. Personally, I can take all Eve Langley likes to write, and come back for more...The book is packed with lively characters music-loving Italians, and casual Australians, university graduates and laborers. Every page is rich with a sincere, almost passionate love of Australia."

See also 
 1954 in Australian literature

References

1954 Australian novels
Angus & Robertson books
Novels set in Victoria (Australia)